Matthew Mazzotta (born March 28, 1977) is an American social practice artist. Mazzotta grew up in Canton, New York, and works internationally. Mazzotta is a 2018 Loeb fellow at Harvard University and a 2019 Guggenheim fellow.

Education 
Mazzotta received a BFA from the School of the Art Institute of Chicago, a Master of Science in Visual Studies from the Massachusetts Institute of Technology's Program in Art, Culture, and Technology. He was a recipient of 2017-18 Loeb Fellowship at Harvard Graduate School of Design and was a 2019-20 Guggenheim Fellow.

Projects

Project Park Spark 
Project Park Spark (2012) is a dog waste powered streetlight installed in Cambridge, Massachusetts. It features a miniature methane digester which feeds methane into an old fashioned gas streetlight.

Cloud House 
Cloud House (2016) is an art installation consisting of a house-like structure built from recycled wood and tin. Inside, it contains two rocking chairs, while a large cloud shaped sculpture is suspended over roof of the structure. When visitors sit in the rocking chairs, they activate the cloud and water falls from the cloud onto the tin roof, creating the soothing sounds of rain on a tin roof.

Storefront Theater 
The Storefront Theater (2016) is an art installation and community center in Lyons, Nebraska. It re-conceptualizes the facade of an abandoned building to fold down into a theater that seats 80, transforming the town's main street into an outdoor theater. Before Mazzotta acquired the property, it was an empty lot with a street fronting facade.

Steeped in Exploration 
Steeped in Exploration (2010) - “A Teahouse without Tea!” – is a socially engaged art project aimed at creating space for dialogues around exploring the “local”, science, public involvement, ecological issues, community building, artists’ sensibilities, bringing criticality to space, and dissecting the systems that make up our “everyday” life.

Awards 
2018
"Architecture Project of the year" - Dezeen Awards at Tate Modern

Architizer A+ Award in the category of "Architecture + Community"

Harpo Foundation Grant for Visual Artists

2017
World Architecture News WAN Awards in the category of Adaptive Reuse

American Architecture Award in the category Museums and Cultural Buildings 

Congress for the New Urbanism – Charter Award

World Architecture Community – 20+10+X Award

CODA Awards Merit Award for Public Space – Cloud House

References

External links

Living people
School of the Art Institute of Chicago alumni
Massachusetts Institute of Technology alumni
1977 births